Rishton (alternative spellings Rishtan, Rishdan, Roshidon, previously called also Kyubishev by Russians) is a city in Fergana Region, in Uzbekistan. It is the administrative center of Rishton District. Its population is 34,800 (2016). It is located about halfway between Kokand and Fergana at latitude 40°21'24N longitude 71°17'5E, and at an elevation of 471 meters.

Rishton is the most famous, and one of the oldest centers of ceramics in Uzbekistan. A fine quality reddish-yellow clay deposit 1-1.5 meters deep and 0.5-1.5 meters thick underlies almost the whole Rishton area. The clay can be used without refinement or addition of other types of clay from other regions. Besides clay, the potters of Rishton extracted various dyes, quartz sand, and fire clay from the surrounding the mountains. The special "ishkor" blue glaze is manufactured by natural mineral pigments and mountain ash plants.

Hanafi scholar Burhan al-Din al-Marghinani, the author of the book al-Hidayah, was born in this small town and grew up in neighbouring Margilan.

Main languages spoken in this area are Tajik and Uzbek.

References

External links 
 http://rishton.uz/
 http://www.euronews.com/2016/02/01/postcards-from-uzbekistan-the-historic-beauty-of-rishtan-ceramics/

Populated places in Fergana Region
Cities in Uzbekistan